Live is a 1999 live album by They Might Be Giants. It was a condensed version of Severe Tire Damage. While most of the tracks were live, as the name implies, "Doctor Worm" was a studio-recorded track.

Track listing
All songs written by They Might Be Giants, unless otherwise noted.

"Birdhouse in Your Soul" - 3:12
"Istanbul (Not Constantinople)" (Jimmy Kennedy, Nat Simon) - 3:07
"Particle Man" - 2:09
"She's Actual Size" - 2:18
"XTC Vs. Adam Ant" - 3:39
"Till My Head Falls Off" - 2:53
"S-E-X-X-Y" (Hal Cragin, They Might Be Giants) - 3:06
"They Got Lost" - 3:42
"Ana Ng" - 3:00
"Doctor Worm" - 3:01

References

External links
Live at This Might Be A Wiki

They Might Be Giants live albums
1999 live albums